Newsbeat was a Telefís Éireann television current and regional affairs programme presented by Frank Hall and broadcast in Ireland live on weekday evenings from 1964 until 1971.

Background
Newsbeat was created by Telefís Éireann as a replacement for the station's flagship current affairs programme Broadsheet. The programme was originally broadcast live from Monday to Friday between 6:01pm and 6:40pm. It was the first television programme by Telefís Éireann to be jointly produced by the News and Programming divisions of the new station.

Content and style
The programme opened with a ten-minute summary of the news and, unlike Broadsheet, concentrated on more off-beat and light-hearted regional filmed reports and unscripted interviews from around Ireland. Frank Hall, as well as being editor of the programme, was also the main presenter.  He was assisted in reporting duties by Michael Ryan and Cathal O'Shannon.

News and Newsbeat were subsequently split into two separate back-to-back programmes before the latter found a regular 25-minute slot weekdays at 7:00pm.  Newsbeat was broadcast for the last time on 11 June 1971.

Presenters
Frank Hall later went on to present the satirical programme Hall's Pictorial Weekly while Michael Ryan went on to  present Nationwide until December 2011.

References

1960s Irish television series
1970s Irish television series
1964 Irish television series debuts
1971 Irish television series endings
Irish television news shows
RTÉ News and Current Affairs
RTÉ original programming